The Partido Lakas ng Masa (PLM) is a democratic socialist political party in the Philippines. Created in 2009, it includes as its affiliate the labor group Bukluran ng Manggagawang Pilipino and is Sanlakas' political party for purposes of contesting non-party-list elections. It is the umbrella group of various organizations such as Zone One Tondo Organization (ZOTO) and Kongreso ng Pagkakaisa ng Maralita ng Lungsod (KPML).

The party fielded Leodegario "Ka Leody" de Guzman as its candidate for the 2022 presidential elections.

Political positions
PLM protested Israeli airstrikes on the Gaza Strip during the Gaza War; a party member remarked that the airstrikes were "Israel's 'Final Solution' to the Palestine people." PLM remained neutral on the issue of postponing the 2011 elections in the Autonomous Region in Muslim Mindanao (ARMM), as a postponement only served to benefit the Liberal Party, while holding the elections would've only promoted the status quo. Instead, the party "supports the continuation of the peace negotiations between the Philippine government and the MILF and any group fighting for self-determination in Mindanao." The party also disapproved of giving former president Gloria Macapagal Arroyo any special treatment against her criminal cases.

On the impeachment of Renato Corona, aside from agreeing that the Chief Justice should be impeached, the party said that members of the Supreme Court of the Philippines are to be selected democratically.

As a democratic socialist party, PLM participates in the political processes of the state, insisting on elections as a legitimate and viable means of achieving socialism. It opposes taking the extralegal route preferred and deemed necessary by Marxist–Leninist–Maoist national democrats. In the 2013 general election, the party supported Ricardo Penson's independent candidacy to the 2013 Senate election, as well as several candidates in local elections, including one candidate in the 2013 House of Representatives elections. For the 2022 general elections, the party fielded Ka Leody de Guzman for the Presidency, Walden Bello for the vice presidency, and Luke Espiritu, Roy Cabonegro, and David D'Angelo for the Senate.

Radio program
PLM produces the weekly radio program RADYO LAKAS NG MASA (Radio Program of the Labouring Masses) on Radyo Inquirer DZIQ 990 every Saturday from 9–10 AM.

Electoral performance

For president

For vice president

Senate

House of Representatives

References

External links
Official website

Democratic socialist parties in Asia
Social democratic parties in Asia
Socialist parties in the Philippines
Political parties established in 2009